Montevista, officially the Municipality of Montevista, is a 3rd class municipality in the province of Davao de Oro, Philippines. According to the 2020 census, it has a population of 46,558 people.

Caumanga, the original name of Montevista, was a peaceful haven of the Mandayan Tribe. During the Japanese occupation, Caumanga became the headquarters of the Japanese Imperial Forces who induced to flock to the place for protection, shelter, medicine, and food. With the increase of Christian settlers in the early part of 1950s, the name "Caumanga" was changed to San Jose in honor of their Patron Saint, Saint Joseph the Worker. However, it was not until June 18, 1966, when Republic Act No. 4808 was issued creating San Jose into a regular town.

History

Long before the coming of Christians, "Caumanga", the original name of Barangay San Jose, was home to Mandayan Tribes. It then became the stop-over for migrants (settlers coming from different parts of the country), who came to the place in search of the fertile Compostela Valley.

The first settlers of Caumanga were Boboy Timbang and two cousins named Isig and Amasig, the disciples of Mongado-the first Mandayan Educator. Then followed by Eduardo Torres, Valentin Mabasag and some Christian settlers Julian A. Mascariñas, Leonardo Toyong Sr., Francisco Ramos and ex-councilor Rufino Ubal. These men helped develop Montevista at its early stage.

During the Japanese occupation of World War II, Caumanga became the headquarters of the Japanese Imperial Forces under Inani Murakami, a Japanese Imperial Officer who befriended Fertig's guerilla movement and the Japanese induced the evacuees to flock to Caumanga for protection, shelter, medicine and food and stayed there for good even after the liberation time.

With the increase of Christian Settlers in the early part of the 1950s, the name Caumanga was changed to San Jose in honor of their patron saint, Saint Joseph the Worker.

In 1960, Councilor Rufino Ubal, a member of the Municipal Council of Nabunturan authored a resolution making San Jose a barrio of Nabunturan. The first elected barrio lieutenant was Francisco Ramos and the first Barangay Captain was Julian A. Mascariñas.

Five years after, the barrio officials and some civic minded citizens initiated the separation of barrio San Jose from its mother municipality thus, in 1965, the Barangay Council of San Jose made a resolution addressed to the Provincial Board, proposing to create Barrio San Jose and neighboring barrios (barangays) into a separate town.

Board member Simplicio Montaño, the Grand Old Man of San Jose who was inspired by a place in California, United States, which had a semblance in topography to San Jose, changed the name from San Jose to Montevista meaning "mountain view". Also it was Montaño who worked hard for its approval in Congress, thus in June 1966, Montevista became a regular municipality.

Montevista became a regular municipality on June 18, 1966, by virtue of Republic Act no. 4808 comprising the six barangays of San Jose, New Visayas, Camansi, Bankerohan Norte, Bankerohan Sur and Linoan. These barangays were formerly parts of the municipalities of Nabunturan, Monkayo, Compostela and Asuncion.

Though Montevista was created on June 18, 1966, its political administration took effect on January 1, 1969, with Bernardo R. Rabanoz as the first elected mayor. After serving his term he was then succeeded by Simplicio Montaño, who barely served a month due to his untimely death. Vice Mayor Julian A. Mascariñas succeeded him and he served as the Municipal Mayor from February 11, 1972, to March 2, 1980. Mayor Bernardo R. Rabanoz took the reign of administration after winning the 1980 electoral race, serving for six years until April 1986.

After the EDSA Revolution, Felipe B. Flores was designated on April 14, 1986, as Officer-In-Charge Mayor under the Freedom Constitution replacing elected Mayor Bernardo R. Rabanoz to last until December 6, 1987. In turn, Emiliano A. Corias was designated as OIC Mayor and served as the Local Chief Executive from December 7, 1987, to February 1, 1988.

During the 1988 local polls, Bernardo R. Rabanoz won the election and remained four terms in the office as mayor. In 1995 elections, Vice Mayor Salvador S. Jauod Sr. became the town's mayor and was reelected in the May 11, 1998, election.

Geography 
The municipality is bordered north by Monkayo; east by Compostela and Monkayo; south by Nabunturan; and west by Asuncion and New Corella, Davao del Norte.

Climate

Barangays
Montevista is politically subdivided into 20 barangays.

Demographics

Economy

References

External links

 Montevista Profile at the DTI Cities and Municipalities Competitive Index
 [ Philippine Standard Geographic Code]
Philippine Census Information

Municipalities of Davao de Oro